The Werzer Arena is a tennis complex in Pörtschach am Wörthersee, Austria. It was the home of the annual Hypo Group Tennis International.

See also
 List of tennis stadiums by capacity

Tennis venues in Austria
Sports venues in Carinthia (state)